The gigabyte is a multiple of the unit byte for digital information. The prefix giga means 109 in the International System of Units (SI). Therefore, one gigabyte is one billion bytes. The unit symbol for the gigabyte is GB.

This definition is used in all contexts of science (especially data science), engineering, business, and many areas of computing, including storage capacities of hard drives, solid state drives, and tapes, as well as data transmission speeds. However, the term is also used in some fields of computer science and information technology to denote  (10243 or 230) bytes, particularly for sizes of RAM. Thus, prior to 1998, some usage of gigabyte has been ambiguous. To resolve this difficulty, IEC 80000-13 clarifies that a gigabyte (GB) is 109 bytes and specifies the term gibibyte (GiB) to denote 230 bytes. These differences are still readily seen for example, when a 400 GB drive's capacity is displayed by Microsoft Windows as 372 GB instead of 372 GiB. Analogously, a memory module that is labeled as having the size "" has one gibibyte of storage capacity.

In response to litigation over whether the makers of electronic storage devices must conform to Microsoft Windows' use of a binary definition of "GB" instead of the metric/decimal definition, the United States District Court for the Northern District of California rejected that argument, ruling that "the U.S. Congress has deemed the decimal definition of gigabyte to be the 'preferred' one for the purposes of 'U.S. trade and commerce.'"

Definition

The term gigabyte has a standard definition of 10003 bytes, as well as a discouraged meaning of 10243 bytes. The latter binary usage originated as compromise technical jargon for byte multiples that needed to be expressed in a power of 2, but lacked a convenient name. As 1024 (210) is approximately 1000 (103), roughly corresponding to SI multiples, it was used for binary multiples as well.

In 1998 the International Electrotechnical Commission (IEC) published standards for binary prefixes, requiring that the gigabyte strictly denote 10003 bytes and gibibyte denote 10243 bytes. By the end of 2007, the IEC Standard had been adopted by the IEEE, EU, and NIST, and in 2009 it was incorporated in the International System of Quantities. Nevertheless, the term gigabyte continues to be widely used with the following two different meanings:

Base 10 (decimal)
 1 GB =  bytes (= 10003 B = 109 B)
Based on powers of 10, this definition uses the prefix giga- as defined in the International System of Units (SI). This is the recommended definition by the International Electrotechnical Commission (IEC). This definition is used in networking contexts and most storage media, particularly hard drives, flash-based storage, and DVDs, and is also consistent with the other uses of the SI prefix in computing, such as CPU clock speeds or measures of performance. The file manager of Mac OS X version 10.6 and later versions are a notable example of this usage in software, which report files sizes in decimal units.

Base 2 (binary)
 1 GiB =  bytes (= 10243 B = 230 B).
The binary definition uses powers of the base 2, as does the architectural principle of binary computers.
This usage is widely promulgated by some operating systems, such as Microsoft Windows in reference to computer memory (e.g., RAM). This definition is synonymous with the unambiguous unit gibibyte.

Consumer confusion
Since the first disk drive, the IBM 350, disk drive manufacturers expressed hard drive capacities using decimal prefixes. With the advent of gigabyte-range drive capacities, manufacturers based most consumer hard drive capacities in certain size classes expressed in decimal gigabytes, such as "500 GB". The exact capacity of a given drive model is usually slightly larger than the class designation. Some operating systems such as OS X express hard drive capacity or file size using decimal multipliers, while others such as Microsoft Windows report size using binary multipliers. This discrepancy causes confusion, as a disk with an advertised capacity of, for example,  (meaning , equal to 372 GiB) might be reported by the operating system as "".

The difference between units based on decimal and binary prefixes increases as a semi-logarithmic (linear-log) function—for example, the decimal kilobyte value is nearly 98% of the kibibyte, a megabyte is under 96% of a mebibyte, and a gigabyte is just over 93% of a gibibyte value. This means that a 300 GB (279 GiB) hard disk might be indicated variously as "300 GB", "279 GB" or "279 GiB", depending on the operating system. As storage sizes increase and larger units are used, these differences become more pronounced.

US lawsuits
A lawsuit decided in 2019 that arose from alleged breach of contract and other claims over the binary and decimal definitions used for "gigabyte" have ended in favor of the manufacturers, with courts holding that the legal definition of gigabyte or GB is 1 GB = 1,000,000,000 (109) bytes (the decimal definition). Specifically, the courts held that "the U.S. Congress has deemed the decimal definition of gigabyte to be the 'preferred' one for the purposes of 'U.S. trade and commerce' .... The California Legislature has likewise adopted the decimal system for all 'transactions in this state'."

Earlier lawsuits had ended in settlement with no court ruling on the question, such as a lawsuit against drive manufacturer Western Digital. Western Digital settled the challenge and added explicit disclaimers to products that the usable capacity may differ from the advertised capacity.
Seagate was sued on similar grounds and also settled.

Other contexts
Because of their physical design, the capacity of modern computer random access memory devices, such as DIMM modules, is always a multiple of a power of 1024. It is thus convenient to use prefixes denoting powers of 1024, known as binary prefixes, in describing them. The former specification is, however, often quoted as "1 GB" when applied to random access memory.

Software allocates memory in varying degrees of granularity as needed to fulfill data structure requirements and binary multiples are usually not required. Other computer capacities and rates, like storage hardware size, data transfer rates, clock speeds, operations per second, etc., do not depend on an inherent base, and are usually presented in decimal units.

Examples of gigabyte-sized storage

 One hour of SDTV video at 2.2 Mbit/s is approximately 1 GB.
 Seven minutes of HDTV video at 19.39 Mbit/s is approximately 1 GB.
 114 minutes of uncompressed CD-quality audio at 1.4 Mbit/s is approximately 1 GB.
 A single layer DVD+R disc can hold about 4.7 GB.
 A dual-layered DVD+R disc can hold about 8.5 GB.
 A single layer Blu-ray can hold about 25 GB.
 The largest Nintendo Switch cartridge available on the market holds about 32 GB.
 A dual-layered Blu-ray can hold about 50 GB.
 A triple-layered Ultra HD Blu-ray can hold about 100 GB.

Unicode character 
The "gigabyte" symbol is encoded by Unicode at code point .

See also
 Orders of magnitude (data)
 Binary prefix

References

External links
 http://physics.nist.gov/cuu/Units/binary.html
 http://www.quinion.com/words/turnsofphrase/tp-kib1.htm 
 https://www.nist.gov/public_affairs/techbeat/tb9903.htm 

Units of information